The 2015 Crescent Women World Cup Vårgårda featured as the ninth round of the 2015 UCI Women's Road World Cup. It was held on 23 August 2015, in Vårgårda, Sweden. Jolien D'Hoore won, beating Giorgia Bronzini and Lisa Brennauer.

Results

World Cup Standings

References

Crescent Women World Cup Vargarda TTT
Crescent Women World Cup Vargarda TTT
Open de Suède Vårgårda
August 2015 sports events in Europe